Nether Lypiatt Manor is a compact, neo-Classical manor house in the mainly rural parish of Thrupp, near Stroud in Gloucestershire. It was formerly the country home of Prince and Princess Michael of Kent and is a Grade I listed building.

Description

The attic storey with dormers was removed in 1844, but replaced by Horder c.1923. It has been praised by architectural historian Mark Girouard as perfectly exemplifying the early eighteenth-century formal house in miniature. It comprises four floors, including a tall basement and an attic floor. Inside, much of the early eighteenth-century panelling survives, as do original stone fireplaces. A fine staircase runs from basement to attic.

There is a possibility that Nether Lypiatt Manor was the influence for the Governor's Palace in Williamsburg, Virginia.

The garden designer Rosemary Verey worked on the gardens of Nether Lypiatt for Prince and Princess Michael.

The grounds have recently been re-developed with a series of new gardens, including a refurbished traditional flower garden in keeping with the original arts and crafts backbone of vistas and hedges.

History
On the death of Thomas Freame in 1689, his estate at Nether Lypiatt was divided between his two co-heiresses.  One, Anne Chamberlayne, obtained the previous house, which stood near to the present house. Her daughter Catherine married judge Charles Coxe (1656–1728), MP for Cirencester and later Gloucester, and circuit judge in Wales, They inherited the house in 1699 and built the present house in the early 1700s. Their son John inherited the house in 1728 after which it passed down in his family until 1914 (though, from 1884, occupied by tenants), when it was bought by Arthur Stanton. He sold it to Mr Corbett Woodall, who commissioned architect Peter Morley Horder to recondition the house, installing bathrooms and planting the avenue of limes to the south.

In 1923 it was bought by Gordon Woodhouse (heir to a Marsala fortune) and his wife, the harpsichordist Violet Gordon Woodhouse, who lived in a menage a cinq.
They added the north-west pavilion and improved the interior. After Gordon's death in 1951, the property passed to Captain John Gwynne, a nephew of Violet. In 1956-7, Frederick Nettlefold, with Jeremy Benson as his architect, lifted and completely rebuilt the roof in strict accordance with the original plan, after an 1848 inaccurate re-roof.

In 1980 it was bought by Prince and Princess Michael.
Other members of the British royal family also lived near Prince and Princess Michael at Nether Lypiatt. Anne, Princess Royal lived at nearby Gatcombe Park, and Charles, Prince of Wales lived at Highgrove House near Tetbury.

Sale
In 2005, Nether Lypiatt Manor was put up for sale. The agent was originally asking for offers in excess of £6 million, but by  February 2006 this had been lowered to £5.5 million. According to the Sunday Times it was purchased by the businessman and Labour life peer Lord Drayson for £5.75 million.

Further reading
For a review of Nether Lypiatt Manor (with 27 photographs) see Christopher Hussey in Country Life, 19 and 26 May 1934, and for Morley Horder’s restorations in particular, see R. Randal Phillips in idem, 24 March and 7 April 1923; see also Osbert Sitwell, Noble Essences or Courteous Revelations and Craftsmen (London 1950), pp. 255-256, and Sachervell Sitwell, British Architects and Craftsmen (4th edn. 1948), p. 40. For a history of Nether Lypiatt, see Mary A Rudd, Historical Records of Bisley with Lypiatt (Gloucester, 1937), wherein, however, the date of the building is wrongly taken as 1717." Quotation from The Nettlefolds, A Genealogical Account of The Family of Nettlefold by C. Anthony Crofton Anno Domini MDCCCClxii. 
All books mentioned In the quotation, can be found, in The British Library.

Telegraph article on the house's history
Nicholas Mander, Country Houses of the Cotswolds (Aurum Press, 2008)

References

Country houses in Gloucestershire
Grade I listed houses in Gloucestershire
Royal residences in the United Kingdom
Stroud District